Kléber Haedens (11 December 1913 in Équeurdreville – 13 August 1976), was a French novelist and journalist. He was a monarchist and a member of the Action Française in the 1930s. During World War II he worked as a secretary for Charles Maurras. He was a friend of Antoine Blondin, Michel Déon and Roger Nimier, and closely linked to the Hussards movement in post-war France. He received the Prix Interallié in 1966 for L'été finit sous les tilleuls and the Grand Prix du roman de l'Académie française in 1974 for Adios.

Bibliography
 L'École des parents, Paris, Corrêa, 1937. Prix Cazes
 Magnolia-Jules, Paris, R.A. Corrêa, 1938
 Gérard de Nerval, ou la sagesse romantique, Paris, Grasset, 1939
 Une Jeune Serpente, Paris, Gallimard, 1940
 Paradoxe sur le roman, Marseille, Sagittaire, 1941
 Le Duc de Reichstadt, pièce en trois actes, Les Cahiers de "Patrie". 1re année, 1941. N°3
 Poésie française : une anthologie, 1942, Paris, La Table Ronde.
 Une Histoire de la littérature française, Paris, Julliard, 1943.
 Franz, Paris-Marseille, Robert-Laffont, 1944
 Adieu à la rose, Paris, Gallimard, 1945
 Salut au Kentucky, Paris, Laffont, 1947.
 La France que j'aime, Paris, Sun, 1964
 L'été finit sous les tilleuls, Paris, Grasset, 1966. Prix Interallié
 Londres que j'aime, Paris, Sun, 1970
 Adios, Paris, Grasset, 1974. Grand Prix du roman de l'Académie française
 L'Air du Pays, preface by Geneviève Dormann, Albin Michel, 1963
 Lettres de la petite ferme, Paris, Grasset, 2000 (posthumous)

References

People from Manche
1913 births
1976 deaths
20th-century French novelists
20th-century French journalists
French literary critics
Grand Prix du roman de l'Académie française winners
People affiliated with Action Française
Prix Interallié winners